The Great Galeoto (Spanish: El gran Galeoto) is a 1951 Spanish drama film directed by Rafael Gil and starring Ana Mariscal and Rafael Durán.

Synopsis 
Ernesto is a young musician who, when his father dies, is forced to stay in Madrid, sharing a house with his executor Julio Villamil, married to the actress Teresa Labisbal, with whom the young man was platonically in love. Although the young man's behavior is impeccable, the rumor created by third parties makes Julio want to fight Ernesto in a duel to the death.

Cast
 Valeriano Andrés as Pedro  
 Manuel Arbó  as Secretario de Ernesto  
 Rafael Bardem as Gabriel  
 Francisco Bernal as Peón del coto de caza  
 Xan das Bolas as Cochero  
 Raúl Cancio as Alcaraz  
 María Cañete 
 Manuel de Juan  as Miembro del consejo  
 Mary Delgado  as Mercedes  
 Rafael Durán  as Ernesto Acedo  
 Juan Espantaleón  as Don Severo Villamil  
 Fernando Fernández de Córdoba as Uceda  
 Concha Fernández  as Castita  
 Félix Fernández as Enciso  
 Enrique Herreros  as Nicasio Heredia de la Escosura  
 Casimiro Hurtado as Senén  
 Manuel Kayser   as Faquir  
 José María Lado as Don Julio Villamil  
 Julia Lajos 
 Helga Liné as Adelina  
 Ana Mariscal as Teresa La Bisbal  
 Ramón Martori  as Don Ángel Acedo  
 Nieves Patiño 
 Manuel Requena 
 Antonio Riquelme 
 Santiago Rivero as Moisés  
 José Sancho Sterling
 Fernando Sancho as Vizconde de Nebreda  
 Vicente Soler as Tomás  
 Juanito Vázquez as Marcel  
 Ángel Álvarez 
 Gabriel Llopart as Actor en la obra  
 María Luisa Ponte as Invitada a la cena  
 José Prada as Hombre que cura a Don Julio  
 José Villasante  as Hombre con toga

References

Bibliography
 de España, Rafael. Directory of Spanish and Portuguese film-makers and films. Greenwood Press, 1994.

External links 

1951 drama films
Spanish drama films
1951 films
1950s Spanish-language films
Films directed by Rafael Gil
Spanish black-and-white films
1950s Spanish films